Mangifera collina is a species of plant in the family Anacardiaceae. It is endemic to an area near Chiang Mai, Thailand.

References

Trees of Thailand
collina
Data deficient plants
Taxonomy articles created by Polbot
Taxa named by André Joseph Guillaume Henri Kostermans